Bohola-Moy Davitts is a Gaelic Athletic Association club based in Foxford, County Mayo, Ireland. The club fields Gaelic football teams in competitions organized by the Mayo GAA county board. The team's nickname is the "Moy Boys"

History
The present club was founded in the early 1970s but there was a very long tradition of football in this area dating back to the founding of the GAA. Teams from the area competed under various names including Bohola, Foxford, Toomore, Killasser, Ballyvarry and the Foxford Geraldines in 1898. From the late 1880s football was played generally in the meadowlands along the River Moy at (Sraith Garbh) Shrahgarrow, close to the present field. Some matches were played in Aughaward in a field owned by Ryans known locally as Sraith Buach. Local teams affiliated to the East Mayo Board under a variety of names, Foxford, Toomore, Ballyvary, Bohola and latterly, Moy Davitts, an amalgamation of Bohola, Foxford and Straide.

The necessity of acquiring a permanent playing pitch was recognised by Pat Conway, long-time Treasurer of Mayo County Board. The arrival of Fr Paddy Feeley to the parish and the involvement of a local committee, which included Tom Durkan and Dom Geoghegan, gave a new impetus to the efforts to find a suitable playing area. The original pitch was purchased in 1947 at a cost of £400.
A meeting took place in Foxford where ten people guaranteed £40 each toward the purchase.

In January 1974 a group of footballers and supporters from the Bohola, Straide and Foxford areas met at the old Bohola School then situated at the rear of the Parish Church. At that meeting it was decided to form a Bohola football club. The then Parish priest Fr Martin Mac Manus was installed as the first Chairman of the club with Joe McEvey as secretary and Willie Malee as treasurer.

In its first year in existence the club won the Divisional Junior title defeating a fancied Charlestown, later defeating Lacken in the County Semi final and narrowly losing to Islandeady in the County final. The club then known as Bohola was promoted to Intermediate status for the coming 1975 season.

Moy Davitts seems to have emerged organically from among the players of both clubs as much out of necessity as by any formal decision of either club's officers. There was no Junior club in Foxford at this time and players from the Foxford area tended to play for Ballyvarry or in some cases Knockmore. Bohola club was formed in 1974 and the Foxford players played for the Junior team, winning the East Mayo title and getting to the county final. Fielding two separate teams from among two small populations was difficult. The under-16s, minors and under-21s of Bohola and Foxford played together from 1976 onwards. This became the practice and eventually it was decided that a formal amalgamation was in the best interests of all the players.

Following a meeting of the Foxford club Bohola GAA Club changed its name to Moy Davitts in 1977, a name which better represented the three parishes along the banks of the River Moy; Straide, native place of Michael Davitt; Bohola, birthplace of the Irish-American athlete Martin Sheridan, and Foxford, the birthplace of the great Argentinian Admiral William Brown.

Current players
 Brian Reape
 Sean Mulroy 
 Cian McHale
 Conor Reid
 Brian Heneghan
 Scratcher

Achievements
 Mayo Under-13 Football League: (2021)
Mayo Intermediate Football Championship’’’ 1996, 2017
 Mayo Minor A Football Championship 2014, 2022
 Mayo Under-21 A Football Championship 2013
 Celebrity Bainisteoir 2012
 Felie Dhoire (Under 14 Football): 2010
 Mayo Under-15 Football Championship: (2011)
 Mayo Under-14 Football Championship:''' (2010)

References

External links
 Moy Davitts GAA Club website

Gaelic games clubs in County Mayo
Gaelic football clubs in County Mayo